Fortuyn can refer to:

Pim Fortuyn, a politician from the Netherlands who was assassinated in 2002
Fortuyn, a Dutch sailing ship under Hendrick Christiaensen that explored New Netherland in the 1610s
Fortuyn, a Dutch sailing ship under Jan Jacobsz Vrijer that was sent on a whaling expedition to Svalbard with Muyden's Neptunus in 1613
Fortuyn, a Dutch sailing ship that sank on its maiden voyage in 1724 after leaving the Cape of Good Hope bound for Batavia